Yaxcabá Municipality (in the Yucatec Maya Language: “place of green earth”) is one of the 106 municipalities in the Mexican state of Yucatán containing  (1079 km2) of land and located roughly 80 km northeast of the city of Mérida.

History
The town is believed to have been founded by the Cocom who survived the destruction of Mayapan, in 1441. After the conquest the area became part of the encomienda system.  The encomienda was established in 1549 for Martín de Luguízamo and was assigned in 1562 to Joaquín de Luguízamo. Juan Jiménez de Tejeda took over the encomienda in 1607 and in 1622, Gregorio de Cetina became encomendero, leaving the property in 1688 to Diego de Cetina. In 1693 the trust was the responsibility of Cristóbal Maldonado Jurado and a minor Fernando Maldonado. Andrés de Valdés later served as encomendero.

Yucatán declared its independence from the Spanish Crown in 1821. On 8 September 1848, a group of Indians under the leadership of Cecilio Chí captured the town during the Caste War of Yucatán. Coronel Eulogio Rosado who was stationed in Mérida retook the village on the orders of the government.

In 1923, Yaxcabá was designated as its own municipality.

Governance
The municipal president is elected for a three-year term. The town council has nine councilpersons, who serve as Secretary and councilors of education, security and roads, agriculture and policing, public lighting, legalities, cemeteries, health, and sports.

Communities
The head of the municipality is Yaxcabá, Yucatán. There are 66 different communities in the municipality, including Abán, Acapulco, Balam, Canakon, Cenote, Chanciteen, Chich, Chimay, Cholul, Chunchucmil, Cola Blanca, Huchin, Kankabzonot, Libre Unión, Miguel Hidalgo, Nicteil, Oxulá, Paraíso, Popola, Quintana Roo, Sacnité, Sahcabá, San Arturo, San Francisco, San Isidro, San José, San José I, San Juan de los Itzá, San Manuel, San Marcos, San Pedro, San Tomás, Santa Amelia, Santa Eugenia, Santa María, Santa Rita, Santa Rosa, Santo Domingo, Sipché, Tahdzibichén, Teelhú, Tiholop, Tinucáh, Tixcacaltuyub, Tzupich, Tzutzuyub, Xabitita, Xanlá, Xíat, Xinchil, Xlapák, X-ochil, Xolobitancia, X-tosil, Xuul, Yokdzonot, Yoxunah. The significant populations are shown below:

Local Festivals 
Each year in April is a fiesta held for the Holy Cross. From 20 to 29 June the town hosts a celebration in honor St. Peter and St. Paul and from 1 to 5 October there is a festival in honor of St. Francis of Assisi.

Landmarks

Architectural 
 Church of St. Francis of Assisi from the colonial era 
 Chapel of the Virgin of Guadalupe from the colonial era.
 Church of Santa Cruz
 Former convent and Church of St. Peter 
 Chapel of St. Nicholas

Archaeological 
Libre unión Yaxunáh, Ixpanioh, Xucul, Yokdzonot, Xcanyá, Tixcacaltuyub and Yanláh.

References 

Municipalities of Yucatán